Duke Street is a street in Ipswich, Suffolk, England, which played an important part in the industrial development of Ipswich. Originally, it was quite short, however, as its modern southern portion was known as St John's Street. Coprolite Street connects it the quay at Neptune Marina, part of Ipswich Waterfront.

History

Duke Street gave access to one of the principal ship building areas of Ipswich in St Clements Parish.

Duke street is shown in Joseph Pennington's map of 1778. This map shows a number of shipyards on the eastern bank of the Orwell between Duke Street and the river.

By the mid nineteenth century the entrance to both the Orwell Works and White City Works sites of Ransomes, Sims & Jefferies were on Duke Street, as well as their garage which housed the electric vehicles.

Notable buildings

References

Streets in England
Ipswich